An All-American team is an honorary sports team composed of the best amateur players of a specific season for each team position—who in turn are given the honorific "All-America" and typically referred to as "All-American athletes", or simply "All-Americans". Although the honorees generally do not compete together as a unit, the term is used in U.S. team sports to refer to players who are selected by members of the national media. Walter Camp selected the first All-America team in the early days of American football in 1889. The 2019 NCAA Women's Basketball All-Americans are honorary lists that will include All-American selections from the Associated Press (AP), the United States Basketball Writers Association (USBWA), and the Women's Basketball Coaches Association (WBCA) for the 2018–19 NCAA Division I women's basketball season. Both AP and USBWA choose three teams, while WBCA lists 10 honorees.

A consensus All-America team in women's basketball has never been organized. This differs from the practice in men's basketball, in which the NCAA uses a combination of selections by AP, USBWA, the National Association of Basketball Coaches (NABC), and the Sporting News to determine a consensus All-America team. The selection of a consensus All-America men's basketball team is possible because all four organizations select at least a first and second team, with only the USBWA not selecting a third team.

Before the 2017–18 season, it was impossible for a consensus women's All-America team to be determined because the AP had been the only body that divided its women's selections into separate teams. The USBWA first named separate teams in 2017–18. The women's counterpart to the NABC, the Women's Basketball Coaches Association (WBCA), continues the USBWA's former practice of selecting a single 10-member (plus ties) team. The Sporting News does not select an All-America team in women's basketball.

By selector

Associated Press (AP)

AP Honorable Mention 

 Bella Alarie, Princeton
 Chastadie Barrs, Lamar 
 Kenisha Bell, Minnesota
 Chennedy Carter, Texas A&M
 Kaila Charles, Maryland
 Crystal Dangerfield, UConn

 Cierra Dillard, Buffalo
 Reyna Frost, Central Michigan
 Ae’rianna Harris, Purdue 
 Ruthy Hebard, Oregon
 Natisha Hiedeman, Marquette
 Jazzmun Holmes, Mississippi State

 Anriel Howard, Mississippi State
 Kiara Leslie, N.C. State
 Tiana Mangakahia, Syracuse
 Aari McDonald, Arizona
 Beatrice Mompremier, Miami 
 Destiny Slocum, Oregon State

United States Basketball Writers Association (USBWA)

Women's Basketball Coaches Association (WBCA)

By player

Academic All-Americans
The College Sports Information Directors of America (CoSIDA) announced its 15-member 2019 Academic All-America team on March 11, 2019, divided into first, second and third teams with Mikayla Ferenz of Idaho chosen as women's college basketball Academic All-American of the Year.

When a player is listed with two grade-point averages, the first is her undergraduate GPA. Players listed with two majors separated by a slash are double majors unless explicitly designated as undergraduate and graduate programs.

References

All-Americans
NCAA Women's Basketball All-Americans